The Songs That Got Away is an album by English soprano Sarah Brightman. The songs selected for this album were allegedly based on an idea by Brightman's then husband Andrew Lloyd Webber. His idea was to incorporate songs which were mostly from West End theatre or Broadway theatre productions that were either unsuccessful, never made it across to the other side of the Atlantic Ocean, were cut from its respective show, or forgotten by time.

All songs were produced by Andrew Lloyd Webber with the exception of "Dreamers". It was produced by its original composer Marvin Hamlisch. Album liner notes were written by Sheridan Morley.

Track listing

 Track 2, "I Am Going to Like It Here", was only on CD issues.

Chart performance

References

1989 albums
Sarah Brightman albums
Albums produced by Andrew Lloyd Webber